Vojtěch Loudín (born 11 November 1990, in Mladá Boleslav) is a Czech short track speed skater.

References

External links
 Vojtěch Loudín's profile, from http://www.sochi2014.com; retrieved 2014-02-10.

1990 births
Living people
Czech male speed skaters
Czech male short track speed skaters
Olympic short track speed skaters of the Czech Republic
Short track speed skaters at the 2014 Winter Olympics
Sportspeople from Mladá Boleslav